The Hoodlum Priest is a 1961 American drama film by Irvin Kershner, based on the life of Father Charles "Dismas" Clark of St. Louis, who ministered to men in prison and men coming out of prison.  During his career Fr. Clark earned the nickname "The Hoodlum Priest." The film was entered into the 1961 Cannes Film Festival. The movie stars Don Murray who also co-produced and co-wrote the screenplay under the pseudonym Don Deer.

Plot
Father Charles Dismas Clark, a Jesuit priest in St. Louis, dedicates his life to the rehabilitation of delinquents and ex-convicts. By meeting them on their own terms and talking their language, he wins their confidence and their trust. He is primarily concerned with a young thief, Billy Lee Jackson, recently released from the Missouri State Penitentiary. Father Clark helps clear the boy of some trumped-up charges and then gets him an honest job with a produce market. Billy's rehabilitation is further encouraged by Ellen Henley, a young socialite with whom he falls in love. Meanwhile, aided by Louis Rosen, a successful criminal lawyer, Father Clark raises enough funds to open Halfway House, a shelter for ex-convicts readjusting to civilian life. All goes well until Billy's employer fires him for a theft he did not commit. Embittered, he and a friend, Pio, attempt to rob the produce market. They are caught by one of the owners, and he attacks Billy with a crowbar. The panic-stricken boy grabs a gun and kills him. The police chase Billy to an abandoned house, and he hides there until Father Clark persuades him to surrender. Tried and convicted of murder, he is sentenced to death. Before Billy dies in the gas chamber, Father Clark reassures him by telling him of Dismas, the thief who died on the cross, and of how Christ promised him eternal life. After the execution, Father Clark returns to Halfway House and finds his first client, Pio, drunk and repentant.

Cast
 Don Murray as Father Charles Dismas Clark
 Larry Gates as Louis Rosen
 Cindi Wood as Ellen Henley
 Keir Dullea as Billy Lee Jackson
 Logan Ramsey as George Hale
 Don Joslyn as Pio Gentile
 Sam Capuano as Mario Mazziotti
 Vince O'Brien as Assistant District Attorney
 Al Mack as Judge Garrity
 Lou Martini as Angelo Mazziotri
 Norman McKay as Father Dunne
 Joseph Cusanelli as Hector Sterne
 Bill Atwood as Weasel
 Roger Ray (actor) as Detective Shattuck
 William Warford as Assistant District Attorney's Aide
 Willard Capen as Extra behind bars in DVD cover

Reception
A.H. Weiler of The New York Times wrote: "An unrelievedly grim, serious and action-filled case against an uncompromising attitude toward former convicts and capital punishment, it evolves, through an unpretentious, documentary treatment, as tough and persuasive, if disquieting, drama...There is no doubt, however, as to the film's sharp, authentic pictorial look, since it was photographed largely in St. Louis, whose lower depths rise strikingly before an audience. Its cheap saloons, alleys and slums, photographed in newsreel detail by Haskell Wexler, lend polish and support to the fast pace maintained by the director, Irvin Kershner, whose experience stems largely from television."

See also
 List of American films of 1961

References

External links

1961 films
1961 drama films
1960s biographical drama films
American biographical drama films
American black-and-white films
1960s English-language films
Films about capital punishment
Films about Catholicism
Films about Catholic priests
Films directed by Irvin Kershner
Films scored by Richard Markowitz
Films set in St. Louis
Films shot in Missouri
Films shot in St. Louis
United Artists films
1960s American films